Andrzeiowskia is a genus of flowering plants belonging to the family Brassicaceae.

Its native range is Southeastern Europe to Caucasus.

Species:

Andrzeiowskia cardamine

References

Brassicaceae
Brassicaceae genera